Felixberto M. Serrano (22 August 1906 – 12 October 1990) was a Filipino politician. Serrano was the secretary of foreign affairs under President Carlos P. Garcia from 1957 to 1961. Previously, he was the permanent representative of the Philippines to the United Nations from 1954 to 1957 and a member of the Philippine House of Representatives from 1945 to 1949, representing the 1st district of Batangas.

Serrano was a delegate to the 1971 Philippine Constitutional Convention and made a speech just before the balloting for candidates for president of the convention accusing other delegates of taking bribes to favour Marcos's intentions in the convention.

Sources
Augusto Fauni Espiritu. Five Faces of Exile: The Nation and Filipino American Intellectuals. Stanford University Press, 2005. p. 213.
Teofisto Guignona Fight for the Filipino. Palm Springs, California: Kenneth Mills, 2013. p. 86-90.

References

20th-century Filipino politicians
1906 births
1990 deaths
Members of the House of Representatives of the Philippines from Batangas
Secretaries of Foreign Affairs of the Philippines
Garcia administration cabinet members
Permanent Representatives of the Philippines to the United Nations